Kjell Åsvestad (born 4 January 1950) is a Norwegian Nordic combined skier.

He was born in Lillehammer, and represented the club Lillehammer SK. He competed at the 1972 Winter Olympics in Sapporo, where he placed 14th.

References

External links

1950 births
Living people
Sportspeople from Lillehammer
Norwegian male Nordic combined skiers
Olympic Nordic combined skiers of Norway
Nordic combined skiers at the 1972 Winter Olympics
20th-century Norwegian people